Ma Long (born 26 February 1990 in Qingdao, Shandong) is a Chinese football player who plays for Tai'an Tiankuang in China League Two.

Club career 
Ma Long is a graduate of the Shandong Luneng under-19 youth team.  He received his promotion to the senior team in 2010 when he made his debut for them as a substitute in a 2010 AFC Champions League game against Sanfrecce Hiroshima in a 1-0 win on February 24, 2010.

In January 2014, Ma moved to China League One side Qingdao Hainiu on a one-year loan deal. After a personally successful loan spell at Qingdao where he gained regular playing time, Ma made his move permanent the following season. On 9 September 2017 in a league game against Hangzhou Greentown, he was caught in a collision while fighting for a header which resulted in him hitting the goalpost, breaking two of his ribs and seeing him miss most of the two following seasons at Qingdao.

Career statistics 
Statistics accurate as of match played 31 December 2019.

Honours
Shandong Luneng
Chinese Super League: 2008

References

External links
Player profile at sodasoccer.com
 

1990 births
Living people
Chinese footballers
Footballers from Qingdao
Shandong Taishan F.C. players
Qingdao F.C. players
Zibo Cuju F.C. players
Chinese Super League players
China League One players
Association football midfielders